HMWK may refer to:

High-molecular-weight keratin
High-molecular-weight kininogen